En Annan, is a 1970 Indian Tamil-language crime thriller film, directed by P. Neelakantan, starring M. G. Ramachandran and Jayalalithaa. The film is a remake of the Telugu film Poola Rangadu (1967), which itself was loosely based on A. J. Cronin's novel, Beyond This Place. It was released on 21 May 1970, and ran 100 days in theatres.

Plot 

Ranga is the son of Velappan, a manager at a mill. Velappan is framed for the murder of one of the partners, Karunagaran. He is sent to jail for a crime he didn't commit. Ranga, since then, works hard to get his sister Thangam educated. She marries a doctor, Murali, who happens to be Karunagaran's son. When he finds out she is Velappan's daughter, he leaves her. Ranga is enraged and beats his lover Valliammal's brother Nagappan, who informs Murali. Ranga is sent to jail. There he meets his father, learns about his innocence and vows to get him out. Once Ranga is released, he earns the goodwill of the other two partners, Nayagam and Dharmaraj, and finally exposes them. Velappan is released, Ranga marries his lover Valli and Murali takes Thangam back.

Cast

Production 
The film was a remake of the Telugu film, Poola Rangadu (1967), which itself was loosely based on A. J. Cronin's novel, Beyond This Place (1953). The song "Nenjam Undu Nermai Undu" was shot in different areas such as Besant Nagar, Central Station, Ripon Building, LIC Building and Anna statue.

Soundtrack 
The soundtrack was composed by K. V. Mahadevan.

Release 
En Annan was released on 21 May 1970. The Indian Express wrote on 23 May, "There is nothing new in the story and nothing new is attempted. [..] The pace is slow but the photography makes up for it".

Legacy 
A film titled Nenjamundu Nermaiyundu Odu Raja was taken from one of the songs of this film as a tribute to Ramachandran. Apart from naming the title, the said song is also retuned for the film.

References

External links 
 

1970 films
1970s crime thriller films
1970s Tamil-language films
Films about miscarriage of justice
Films based on works by A. J. Cronin
Films directed by P. Neelakantan
Films scored by K. V. Mahadevan
Indian crime thriller films
Tamil remakes of Telugu films